The cinema of Namibia refers to cinema in the country of Namibia, which claimed independence from South Africa in 1990.

Before independence, American anthropologist John Marshall made ethnographic films of the Ju/'hoansi for over four decades from 1950 onwards, resulting in documentary films such as The Hunters (1957) and Nǃai, the Story of a ǃKung Woman (1980).

After independence, Namibian filmmakers have started to assert their own identity. Pioneers included Bridget Pickering, Richard Pakleppa and Cecil Moller. They have been joined by a younger generation including Joel Haikali, Oshosheni Hiveluah, Perivi Katjavivi, Tim Huebschle, and Krischka Stoffels.

In 2000, the Namibian government passed the Namibian Film Commission Act to promote filmmaking in the country.

References